Emeralds GAA is a junior  Gaelic Athletic Association club located in Urlingford, County Kilkenny, Ireland. The club was founded in 1972 and almost exclusively fields teams in hurling.
They spent 14 seasons in intermediate grade in Kilkenny before being relegated in 2015 back to the junior grade.

History
In the early years of the 20th, century hurling was very strong in the parish of Urlingford with three teams competing.  – Graine, Urlingford and Clomanta. Despite large competition, it was clear that a unified parish hurling team would provide a stronger and more capable force to compete against the larger parishes of the county.

The Emeralds club was formed in 1972 when both Clomanto and Urlingford united under the new name of Emeralds.

Honours
 Kilkenny Junior Hurling Championship (3): 2001, 1905 (as Owen Ruas), 1947 (as Johnstown-Urlingford) (Runners-Up 1972, 1981, 1984, 1999)
 Leinster Junior Club Hurling Championship (0): (Runners-Up 2001)
 Kilkenny Senior Hurling Championship (0): (Runners-Up 1889 (as Graine) , 1924 (as Clomanto) , 1930 and 1931)(as Urlingford)
 Kilkenny Intermediate Hurling Championship (1): 1929 (as Urlingford) (Runners-Up 2013)
 All-Ireland Junior B Club Hurling Championship(0): (Runners-up 2008)
 Leinster Junior B Club Hurling Championship (1): 2008
 Kilkenny Under-21 B Hurling Championship (1): 2014
 Kilkenny Minor Hurling Championship (1): 2000
 Féile na nGael Division 3 (1): 2018

Notable Players
 Derek Lyng
 Aidan Fogarty
 David Burke
 Conor Martin
 Killian Doyle

References

 Emeralds GAA website

Gaelic games clubs in County Kilkenny
Hurling clubs in County Kilkenny
1972 establishments in Ireland